Charlotte Bathe (born 22 September 1965) is a British equestrian. She competed in the individual eventing at the 1996 Summer Olympics.

References

External links
 

1965 births
Living people
British female equestrians
Olympic equestrians of Great Britain
Equestrians at the 1996 Summer Olympics
Sportspeople from Ipswich